A list of windmills in Deux-Sèvres, France.

External links
French windmills website

Windmills in France
Deux-Sèvres
Buildings and structures in Deux-Sèvres